The 2015 Philadelphia Union season was the club's sixth season of existence, competing in Major League Soccer, the top flight of American soccer. The team was managed by Jim Curtin, his second season with the club and first full season after taking over from John Hackworth midway through the 2014 season. For the second consecutive season, the Union finished runners-up in the 2015 U.S. Open Cup, this time to Sporting Kansas City. The 2015 season also marked the departure of CEO Nick Sakiewicz, who had been with the club since its inaugural season. Sakiewicz was replaced with former U.S. men's national team player, Earnie Stewart, who was named Sporting Director in October 2015.

Background

2014 MLS regular season
The 2014 Philadelphia Union MLS Regular Season saw the team go 10–12–12 finishing 6th in the Eastern Conference and 12th overall. The Union had a slow first half of the season, winning only 3 of their 16 games. Because of this, head coach John Hackworth was fired and Jim Curtin was named the club's interim head coach. Following the summer break, the Union saw better results, and were in a position to reach the 2014 MLS Cup Playoffs. However, a loss to the Columbus Crew SC on October 11, 2014 put them out of the playoff race. After the season was over, the title "interim" was taken removed from Jim Curtin's title and is now the permanent head coach.

2014 U.S. Open Cup
The 2014 U.S. Open Cup was the most successful Open Cup in the club's history. The Union entered the competition in the fourth round along with the other 18 MLS clubs. In that round, the Union defeated the Harrisburg City Islanders, a team in the third tier of the American soccer pyramid, 3-1 after extra time. In the next round, the Union defeated the NASL team the New York Cosmos 2-1 after extra time. The Union then defeated the New England Revolution 2-0 in the quarterfinals and FC Dallas 4-3 on penalty kicks after a 1–1 tie in the semifinals. In the final, the Union lost to Seattle Sounders FC 3-1 after extra time.

2015 roster

As of August 29, 2015.

Out on loan

Squad breakdown

Current squad

Competitions

Preseason

MLS season

Standings

Eastern Conference standings

Overall standings

U.S. Open Cup 

Philadelphia entered the 2015 U.S. Open Cup with the rest of Major League Soccer in the fourth round.

Friendlies

Statistics

Statistics are from all MLS league matches.

Goalkeepers

Honors and awards

End of Season Awards
2015 MLS Team Fair Play Award

Transfers

In

Out

Loan in

Loan out

References

Philadelphia Union seasons
Philadelphia Union
Philadelphia Union
Philadelphia Union